A stroad is a type of thoroughfare that is a mix between a street and a road. The word stroad is a portmanteau of street and road, coined by American civil engineer and urban planner Charles Marohn in 2011, as a commentary about paved traffic structures in the United States. The term has also been applied to various traffic situations in Canada.

Concept

Poor mix of street and road functions 
According to Marohn, a stroad is a bad combination of two types of vehicular pathways: it is part street—which he describes as a "complex environment where life in the city happens", with pedestrians, cars, buildings close to the sidewalk for easy accessibility, with many (property) entrances / exits to and from the street, and with spaces for temporary parking and delivery vehicles—and part road, which he describes as a "high-speed connection between two places" with wide lanes and limited entrances and exits, and which are generally straight or have gentle curves. 

In essence, Marohn defines a stroad as a high-speed road with many turnoffs which lacks safety features. In his commentary, Marohn states that stroads do not function well as either a street or a road. According to Marohn, the problem with stroads is that engineering codes tend to emphasize speed and traffic flow rather than safety, so that stroads try to be "all things to all people" but end up failing in every way as a result. 

Dover and Massengale (2014) stated that the design of roads as highways/motorways was originally modelled on the railroad, namely an efficient connection between two populated places (cities, towns, villages) with a car, while streets formed networks inside a place to move around that place with numerous different modes of transportation to make it financially productive; these two systems functioned well as long they were kept separated,But when we reconfigure our streets to have the characteristics of roads—as stroads—we are no longer able to capture the value of share the space. A modern stroad ... is about the least safe traffic environment you could be in, too, with high-speed designs mashed up with turning traffic, stop-and-go traffic, sudden lane changes, and obnoxious signage. This ridiculously unsafe design is accepted as "normal" just because it was allowed to become ubiquitous.They noted that the general public is often not aware of the functional distinction that engineers (as well as dictionaries) make between streets and roads, that street names ending with 'street' or 'road' (for historical reasons) may be misleading and not align with the current de facto traffic situation, and that mixing up the functions of streets and roads causes numerous problems.

The concept of the stroad was popularized in large part as a result of an April 2021 short documentary by Canadian-born Amsterdam-based Youtube Channel, Jason Slaughter's urban planning YouTube channel "Not Just Bikes", which went viral, and  stated that stroads in North America are "ugly, dangerous, and inefficient", as well as more expensive, contrasting them with road design in the Netherlands, where clear functional distinctions between motorways (highways), roads, and streets were introduced in the 1990s. These measures were aimed at increasing safety, traffic flow, and cost-effectiveness, while also having the effect of reducing car dependency, increasing walkability, cycleability, and general livability.

In some cases, roads become stroads due to a lack of access management implementation when facilities are expanded or widened, often with the aim of improving mobility. The road becomes a stroad over time from development adding private accessways onto the main road, increasing congestion and collisions, which thus requires traffic control additions such as traffic signals. This degrades the roadway quality in terms of mobility.

Champs-Élysées comparison 

According to Charles Marohn, the famous Champs-Élysées in Paris was effectively a stroad as recently as 2001. In the middle of the avenue were three automobile traffic lanes in either direction, ostensibly fulfilling the function of a road. A wide buffer of trees existed on either side of the road area, separating the roadway from slip lanes for slow-driving traffic. These slip lanes fulfilled the function of streets, providing access to parking, sidewalks, shops and restaurants. Because the street and road areas of the Champs-Élysées were physically separated, this stroad environment actually managed some success in allowing both safe high-speed traffic (up to ) in the center roadway and a productive street environment on the sides.  however, the slip lanes are fully pedestrianized, while the center roadway functions as a true road. 

The Esplanade in Chico, California is, according to Marohn, a rare example of a successful 'stroad' akin to the 2001 version of the Parisian Champs-Élysées in that buffers of trees physically separate the high-speed 'road' part in the middle from the two low-speed productive 'streets' on the sides (lined by houses which had high property values). He contrasted the Esplanade to Mangrove Avenue, a stroad just five blocks to the east in Chico that runs parallel to the Esplanade, but has all the typical issues of a stroad in that the street and road functions are not physically separated, and the environment is low-density and much less productive, with gas stations, strip malls and other car-oriented businesses.

Unlike Marohn, however, Jason Slaughter ("Not Just Bikes") does not categorize such traffic situations as a "stroad", but as "a road with streets on either side to access houses".

Overspeeding and collisions due to design 

Stroads often do not take into account how human psychology usually determines the speed at which people drive based on the road conditions they observe. Simply reducing the posted speed limit (PSL) with a traffic sign, which is a widely adopted strategy attempting to prevent motorists from driving dangerously fast, may not work in practice "if the road conditions suggest that the PSL is too low, drivers may simply ignore it". 

A better strategy to make people comply with the legal speed limit is to design roads and streets in a way that they are "self-explanatory". Self-explaining roads and streets use physical and perceptual cues (also referred to as traffic calming), which lead people to automatically drive more slowly and cautiously wherever they perceive that to be necessary for their own safety, as well as that of others, especially more vulnerable road users such as pedestrians and cyclists. Such cues include "narrower lanes, tighter corner radii, gateway treatments, changed roadway surface materials and appearance, mini roundabouts and other speed management techniques" such as speed bumps. The typical lack of these cues on stroads causes motorists to drive much faster than is safe to do in the environment they are in, with many entries and exits creating points of conflict and potential collisions, especially at higher speeds.

Traffic planners in cities such as Boston, Houston, and St. Louis are rethinking their street designs to lessen collisions and the deaths of pedestrians and cyclists. , the city of Boston is studying how to minimize pedestrian traffic deaths by lowering speed limits and redesigning stroads via road diets; the 2018 report from its Vision Zero Coalition suggested that the problem with stroads was that they gave off a false sense that drivers could drive at dangerously fast speeds.

Car dependency and congestion 
Although stroads facilitate the goal of making all destinations reachable by car, they also practically force everyone to use (and own) a car, and thus increase car dependency (at the cost of walkability and easy use of public transport), while not necessarily making travelling by car more efficient. Despite the high speeds that stroads were designed for, which has made them needlessly dangerous, in practice they frequently end up being clogged with cars seeking access from the many entrances, so that the average speeds on stroads are low due to traffic congestion. Widening stroads to counter congestion usually only leads to induced demand and extra costs.

Sidewalk quality 

The quality of sidewalks (British English: pavement) next to stroads is often poor. Many stroads do not feature any sidewalks at all. In the case of stroad-like suburban residential streets, sidewalks are sometimes deliberately left out by design in order "to further the rural image". Whereas stroads often feature a repetitive pattern of retail franchises on the side with very few sidewalks for pedestrians, there are usually large parking spaces for drivers. Sometimes there are only "painted sidewalks" next to a strip mall, without curbs or traffic bollards to somewhat protect pedestrians against vehicles that may deviate from the road. 

Marohn (2021) stated: "A person on a sidewalk has no defense at all if a vehicle leaves the roadway at stroad speeds". He pointed out that traffic lights, such as those next to the State Street stroad in Springfield, Massachusetts, are often designed with shear pins at the base so as to break off if a vehicle happens to crash into it; although this design increases the safety of the driver and any passengers, it also significantly decreases the safety of any pedestrians who may be standing or walking on the sidewalk behind the traffic signal. Marohn was astonished to discover that even a bench had been placed right next to this breakaway traffic light pole, "inviting people to sit in a place where the chance of a driver losing control and going off the roadway at high speeds is so great that the city installed breakaway poles." At intersecting stroads, vehicles often need to decelerate from a high to a low speed to make a sharp turn right at a long turn lane next to a sidewalk; this makes walking there particularly dangerous for pedestrians. Sidewalks are sometimes too narrow, feature many obstructions such as street lights, as well as driveway cuts, which make them pedestrian-unfriendly.

Walking for a distance of  along a stroad (Farm to Market Road 1960 or Cypress Creek Parkway) in Houston was what motivated Jason Slaughter ("Not Just Bikes") to wonder who could have possibly designed such a situation, and how urban planning could be done much safer and more efficiently (by improving walkability and reducing car dependency). The rather narrow sidewalks, and in the middle section (crossing a bridge and a railroad) no sidewalk at all, were right next to fast-driving vehicular traffic (creating an extremely unsafe and unpleasant environment for pedestrians. Yet, the fact that the grass where one would expect a sidewalk was well-trodden, and Google Street View images also showed that people used it, was evidence to Slaughter that a significant number of pedestrians apparently saw or had no other option (such as taking a car, taxi or bus) than to walk along this dangerous stroad to get to their destinations without basic pedestrian protections. He argued: "There is no excuse for this. If you have enough room for 7 lanes of car traffic, then you have enough room for a sidewalk. Or a bicycle path."

Return on investment 

Marohn (2017) stated that stroads "are enormously expensive to build and, ultimately, financially unproductive". This is because "stroads are built to a highway standard, their lanes are very wide, and there are never [fewer] than four lanes", or "at least three through lanes", and they usually take up extra space for shoulders and clear zones. Stroads feature many more entrances and exits than limited-access highways and roads and thus require more turning lanes, and because stroad vehicle speeds may be higher than on a street, the turning lanes are much longer to allow vehicles to decelerate and reduce the risk of rear-end collisions; this means stroads require more and longer turning lanes, which are more expensive to build and maintain and take up more space than streets and roads do. The high frequency of accesses to a stroad with much traffic often prompts the construction of traffic lights at intersections, which may cost up to $250,000 to build (excluding maintenance costs). 

An extreme example of this is found on the intersection of Charleston Boulevard with Decatur Boulevard in Las Vegas, which features seven approach lanes, each of which has traffic lights. The larger size of stroads compared to streets and roads means they require more space which needs to be purchased, flattened and asphalted, which reduces the property value of the land, increases the cost of flood protection infrastructure, and asphalt and traffic control system maintenance costs. Compared to households along urban streets, stroads tend to double the costs that households pay on the construction and maintenance of infrastructure, as well as the delivery of public services, while the tax revenues per acre of properties along stroads pale in comparison to urban commercial streets. 

The space taken up by stroads, as well as the large areas dedicated to parking lots at the destinations of cars using stroads, result in low-density land use (typical for urban sprawl). This makes stroad environments financially significantly less productive and tax-generating than a street, but with significantly more infrastructure and thus high-cost per area maintenance costs, so that they become a net-negative and financial burden for cities, because they cannot sustain themselves.

Improving stroads 
Arguing that stroads represent a poor return on investment and safety hazard, Marohn suggested that stroads should either be converted to a street, for land access, or a road, for mobility.  Conversion to a street would involve slowing traffic, prioritising people over cars, and encouraging complex community interactions and solution. Conversion to a road would involve separating the road from shops, reducing the number of access road. The Champs-Élysées with its slip lanes is given as  example of one such conversion.

Examples 

 California State Route 82, part of El Camino Real, has a 43-mile-long stroad between San Francisco and San Jose.
 Charleston Boulevard, part of the Nevada State Route 159 in Clark County, Nevada, is a stroad in Las Vegas. Pedestrian crossings (crosswalks) over or parallel to Charleston Boulevard tend to be quite long and unsafe, while sidewalks tend to be narrow, feature many obstructions such as street lights, as well as driveway cuts, which make them pedestrian-unfriendly.
 Georgia State Route 13, also known as the Buford Highway and the Atlanta Highway, is a stroad north of Atlanta, Georgia. The Buford Highway community along this stroad, which features many strip malls, is home to a diverse immigrant community where car ownership is low, and the pedestrian fatality rates are amongst the highest in the state of Georgia. , the Atlanta-based Canvas Planning Group urban community planning and designing consulting firm is co-operating with the local non-profit organisation We Love BuHi to construct 'additional, safer, and more pleasant walking routes by connecting the walkways in front of the many strip malls with painted sidewalks'. 
 Lancaster Avenue in Bryn Mawr, Pennsylvania, has been identified as a stroad, because it is a street designed like a road with overly expensive infrastructure, low return on investment, and unsafe traffic conditions for both drivers, cyclists and pedestrians.
 The Las Vegas Strip is an infamously clogged stroad in Clark County, Nevada, that forms part of the Las Vegas Boulevard (part of Nevada State Route 604). According to Ray Delahanty (CityNerd), the Las Vegas Strip "is the ultimate stroad", and the word "strip" was a commonly used term to describe "stroads" before Marohn coined the latter term with a specific definition.
 Linn County, Iowa has several stroads, with "Corridor Urbanism" co-founders Bruce Nesmith and Ben Kaplan (2021) pointing to Collins Road, Edgewood Road and Williams Boulevard in Cedar Rapids, as well as Highway 151, Highway 13, Linnview Avenue, Eagleview Drive, Highway 100, East Post Road, Menards Lane, and Seventh Avenue in Marion. They criticized Marion City Council's decision to invest in red light cameras at six intersections of the aforementioned stroads in Marion, while statistics had identified red light running as the cause of only 46 out of all 347 crashes (13.3%) in the previous six years, arguing that redesigning the roads would be a far better solution.
 Macleod Trail between Calgary and Fort Macleod in the Canadian province of Alberta, particularly the stretch between the Elbow River and 90 Avenue SE, has been identified as a stroad by Tom Babin ("Shifter"). One of the most significant characteristics of this stretch is that this "stroad" part has a rather poor safety record, because it has some of the highest collision rates in the city of Calgary, while at the Macleod Trail part to the north closer to downtown (where it is more like a "street"), as well as the part further to the south (where it is more like a "road"), there were far fewer crashes by comparison.
 State Street in Springfield, Massachusetts, has been identified as a stroad by Charles Marohn (2021) in a case study involving the death of a seven-year-old girl and the serious injury of her mother and eight-year-old cousin after they were hit by a car on State Street next to the Central Library on December 3, 2014. Marohn stated: 'While many engineers have tried, it is impossible to make a stroad safe. State Street in Springfield has one of the highest crash rates in the state of Massachusetts. The only way to improve safety on a stroad is to convert it into a street or a road.'
 Wonderland Road in London, Ontario, has been identified as a five-lane stroad by Jason Slaughter ("Not Just Bikes"), who grew up next to it. The city council considered widening Wonderland Road to seven lanes in an attempt to alleviate congestion, but in 2021 it voted 9 to 5 against the plan, because the council majority reasoned that it would only lead to induced demand, 212 million Canadian dollars in construction costs plus higher maintenance costs, and a significantly higher environmental impact, without actually solving the congestion problem.

See also 
Arterial road
Collector road
Intersection (road)
Mobility transition
Ring road
Road hierarchy
Road traffic safety § Designing for pedestrians and cyclists
Roundabout
Zoning in the United States

External links 

 Seven Stroads That Have Been Converted to Streets

Notes

References

Bibliography 
 
 
 
 

Types of roads
Transportation engineering
Road infrastructure
2011 neologisms